Greg Drake (born 14 February 1969) is an Australian former professional rugby league footballer who played as a  in the 1980s and the 1990s.  He played for the Parramatta Eels, and the South Sydney Rabbitohs.

Drake made his debut for Parramatta in round 5 of the 1989 season against the North Sydney Bears.  Drake was released by Parramatta at the end of 1992.  In 1995, Drake joined Souths and played nine games for the club before retiring at the end of the season.

References

1969 births
Living people
Australian rugby league players
Parramatta Eels players
Rugby league props
South Sydney Rabbitohs players
Place of birth missing (living people)